Iago López Marra (born 7 April 1990 in Portosín, Galicia) is a Spanish sailor. He started sailing in his hometown of Portosín at age twelve. He later moved to Santander and teamed with Diego Botín. The duo placed 9th at the 2016 Summer Olympics and 4th at the 2020 Summer Olympics.

Early life 

López began sailing at the age of 11 at the Real Club  competing in the Optimist 420 and 470 classes.

Career 
When he was 18, he joined the High-Performance Sailing Center of Santander, where he combined regattas with his studies in naval engineering.

In the 2013 season, he was part of the crew of the Swan 80, Plis Play, which won the Fastnet Race in Plymouth.

During the 2014 season, he was a member of the 100-foot super maxi Esimit / Europa which performed on the Mediterranean circuit.

He was a team member for the Spanish SailGP team and Star Sailors League. He competed in the 69F and A classes, in which he won vice-champion at Spain 2020 and champion at France 2021.

In the 2022 season, he began the year aboard the Comanche, skippered by Mitch Booth, winning the RORC 2022 transatlantic and IMA Trophy. The Comanche set a new race record for the 3,000 nautical mile course from Lanzarote to Granada of 7 days, 22 hours, 1 minute, and 4 seconds. The new record broke the previous record by more than two days.

International results

Notes

References

External links
 
 
 
 
 Series: 2018 A-Cat World Championship - OPEN at MySailingClub

1990 births
Living people
Spanish male sailors (sport)
Olympic sailors of Spain
Sailors at the 2016 Summer Olympics – 49er
Sailors at the 2020 Summer Olympics – 49er